Pownal may refer to:

 Pownal, Prince Edward Island, in Queens County, Prince Edward Island, Canada
 Pownal, Maine, United States, a New England town
 Pownal, Vermont, United States, a New England town
 Pownal (CDP), Vermont, United States, village within the town

See also
 Pownall (disambiguation)